Hevingham is a village and civil parish in the Broadland district of the English county of Norfolk. Situated between the A140 road Norwich to Cromer road and the B1149 road Norwich to Holt road.

Hevingham parish covers a wide area—. The village has grown slightly since the 1891 census (which showed a population of 760) to its level of 1,150 in 452 households as shown in 2001 census. then a population of 1,260 in 485 households at the 2011 Census.

History
The village name has Old English origins and is translated as homestead of the people of Hefa.

The village is documented in the Domesday Book where it is recorded as Heuincham "where one freeman, a priest, is recorded as holding 40 acres in alms for the King". The village of Rippon or Ripton is noted within Hevingham but this village was deserted during the medieval period. Its exact location is unknown.

‘William White's History, Gazetteer, and Directory of Norfolk 1845’ described Hevingham thus:

Archaeological evidence shows that the site of the village has been occupied since the Bronze Age. But there are much earlier signs of activity, a Mesolithic flint axe-head being the earliest archaeological find recorded, with several Neolithic flint axe-heads also being recovered.

There is evidence of Roman activity. A Roman iron-working site was found during ploughing and was subsequently excavated. Archaeologists also investigated pottery kilns in the parish in the 1950s. Five kilns were recorded. These produced cooking vessels and other pottery during the 2nd century. The names of two potters who worked at the site – INGENU and ESAMI are recorded on the stamps they used on their pottery. There also extensive finds recorded from throughout the Saxon period.

With its red brick 16th century manor house, Park Farm is the former site  of a moated bishops' palace. Built in 1250 by Walter de Suffield, Bishop of Norwich and used by subsequent bishops until the ownership of the land was passed to the Crown by Bishop Nix in 1531. Earthworks of the moat can still be seen and many artefacts have been found on the site by the current landowner. Adjacent Hevingham Park, a medieval wood may have been a deer park connected to the palace. There is also a massive bank and ditch marking the parish boundary.

There are records of a post medieval windmill or Smock mill which stood in the North east part of the village, to the west of the Cromer road and was sold at auction 'to be dismantled' in 1869.

Other notable historic buildings include – Pound Farm House, built in 1675 on The Street/Halls Corner, The Free School (Old School House) built by John Hall in 1726 on the Cromer Road, Avenue Farm House – built in 1835 and Hevingham Primary School, built in 1875 with a capacity of 100 students (currently 98 enrolled).

The site of a camping ground, or recreation field, where 'Camping' a forerunner to modern day Association football was played may be recorded in the modern names of Camping Beck and Camping Bridge.

There is a complete World War II pillbox located in the south-western corner of Buxton Heath, itself a site of special scientific interest.

The parish church
St Mary the Virgin and St Botolph church was mainly built in 1300 but parts of the church may date back to the Norman period. Situated one mile north of the village centre, the church is dedicated to Botolph of Thorney; an English 7th century saint of travellers and farmers. The old rectory built in 1788 for the Reverend J. Alderson, is now a care home.

The village sign

A sign of two crossed birch brooms which recalls a staple industry of the village in the past. The idea for the sign was conceived by a Mr. Wymer, one of the last of the brushmakers. The background imagery of the sign fits with the description given by Rev. Francis Blomfield when he wrote about the village in 1750, mentioning that "it lay at the confluence of several small streams". The sign is situated at the corner of the village green on Westgate (Formerly a pond called 'Westgate pit') and the current incarnation was erected in 2009.

The village today
Amenities in the village include two public houses, The Fox and The Marsham Arms. On 11 July 2010 The Marsham Arms suffered a serious fire which resulted in its closure. After restoration the pub re-opened in May 2011, There is also a village hall where various events are held and which can be hired privately, the hall was built in 2000 to replace an older building and opened by Bernard Matthews. The main industries in the village are forestry and farming. Sanders Coaches provide regular bus services linking the village to several destinations including Holt and Norwich. Leisure facilities include fishing lakes Cobbleacre and Hevingham Lakes which also has a caravan and camping park.

Notable people
 Frederick Savage, engineer and inventor
Victoria Williamson, elite bobsledder and former track cyclist

Photo gallery

Notes

External links

Villages in Norfolk
Broadland
Civil parishes in Norfolk